Minuscule 138 (in the Gregory-Aland numbering), A304 (Soden), is a Greek minuscule manuscript of the New Testament, on parchment leaves. Palaeographically it has been assigned to the 11th century. The manuscript is lacunose.

Description 

The codex contains the text of the four Gospels on 380 parchment leaves (size ), with a commentary, and minor lacunae.
The text is written in one column per page, 37 lines per page.

The commentary on Mark is of Victor, 
mixed up with the text, both in slovenly hand.

It contains synaxaria, Menologion, and pictures. At the end of each Gospel were added subscriptions with numbers of verses. Mark 16:9-20 was marked by an obelus as doubtful.

The text of Matthew 1:1-4:11 was supplied by a later hand.

Text 

The Greek text of the codex is a representative of the Byzantine text-type. Aland placed it in Category V.
According to the Claremont Profile Method it represents the textual family Kx in Luke 1. In Luke 10 and Luke 20 no profile was made.

History 

The manuscript was examined by Birch (about 1782), Scholz, and Burgon. C. R. Gregory saw the manuscript in 1886.

It is currently housed at the Vatican Library (Vat. gr. 757), at Rome.

See also 
 List of New Testament minuscules
 Biblical manuscript
 Textual criticism

References

Further reading

External links 
 Minuscule 138 at the Encyclopedia of Textual Criticism

Greek New Testament minuscules
12th-century biblical manuscripts
Manuscripts of the Vatican Library